Tilsa Marcela Lozano Sibila (born Lima, October 31, 1982) is a Peruvian model. Tilsa is also a Playboy TV actress for Latin America & Iberia.

Her father is from Argentina. She has posed for magazines such as Maxim, SoHo, Cosas Hombre and Caras. She has also worked with designers such as Claudia Bertolero, Fabrizio Célleri, Jennifer Nicholson, Ana María Guiulfo and Stika Semsch.

She acted in the series Surfing Attraction, Bunny World and Seduction Weapons for Playboy.

Titles
 Miss Hawaiian Tropic Perú (2006)
 Miss Reef Perú (2007)
 Miss Reef International (2008)
 Miss Playboy TV Latinoamérica & Iberia (2008)

Partial filmography

References
In Spanish:

External links
 
 

People from Lima
Peruvian female models
Peruvian people of Argentine descent
21st-century Peruvian actresses
1982 births
Living people
Actresses from Lima
Peruvian television actresses